Masoom  is a 1960 Indian Bollywood film directed by Satyen Bose. It stars Ashok Kumar, Sarosh Irani, Honey Irani, Ghanashyam Nayak and Mohan Choti. Screenwriter Ruby Sen won the Filmfare Award for Best Story. It was also nominated for a Filmfare Award for Best Movie. The music, by Robin Banerjee, includes songs such as 'Nani Teri Morni Ko Mor Le Gaye' and 'Humein Un Raahon Par Chalna Hai Jahaan Girna Aur Sambhalna Hai'.

Cast
Sarosh Irani as Debesh Sharma / Debu
Aziz as Mohan Sharma / Mannu
Honey Irani as Tunni
Manmohan Krishna as Madhavlal Sharma
Ashok Kumar as Mr. Khan
Chaman Puri as School Headmaster
Ghanashyam Nayak as child artist (on screen name given Ghanshyam)
Gautam as Dr. S K Gupta
Anubha Gupta as Mrs. Gupta

Music
Music direction by Robin Banerjee. Banerjee composed songs with the assistance of YouTube artist and composer Aditya Sengupta's grandfather music director Anil Chandra Sengupta. "Nani Teri Morni Ko Mor Le Gaye" sung by Ranu Mukherjee.

"Tu Prem Nagar Ka Pyara Sadhu" - Sabita Chowdhury, Mohammed Rafi
"Desh Ka Pyara" - Asha Bhosle
"Hamen Un Raahon Par Chalna Hain" - Subir Sen
"Nani Teri Morni Ko Mor Le Gaye" - Ranu Mukherjee

References

External links
 

1960 films
1960s Hindi-language films